Conus sinaiensis is a species of sea snail, a marine gastropod mollusk in the family Conidae, the cone snails, cone shells or cones.

These snails are predatory and venomous. They are capable of "stinging" humans.

Description

Distribution
This marine species of cone snail occurs in the Gulf of Aqaba.

References

 Petuch E.J. & Berschauer D.P. (2016). A new species of Miliariconus Tucker and Tenorio, 2009 (Conidae: Puncticulinae) from the northern Red Sea. The Festivus. 48(3): 183-187

External links
 

sinaiensis
Gastropods described in 2016